The Yokosuka R2Y Keiun (景雲 - "Cirrus Cloud") was a prototype reconnaissance aircraft built in Japan late in World War II.

Design and development
Commissioned for the Imperial Japanese Navy after the R1Y design was cancelled due to its disappointing performance estimates, the R2Y used coupled engines driving a single propeller and also featured a tricycle undercarriage.

Completed in April 1945, the prototype made a short flight on 8 May, but was destroyed in a US air raid only a few days later, thus ending development.

A proposal was also made to develop the R2Y into a turbojet-powered light bomber by replacing its piston engines with two Mitsubishi Ne-330s. Designated the R2Y2 Keiun Kai, was not constructed before the end of the war.

Specifications (R2Y1)

See also

References

Notes

Bibliography

1940s Japanese experimental aircraft
1940s Japanese military reconnaissance aircraft
Yokosuka aircraft
Aircraft first flown in 1945
Mid-engined aircraft